Roy Bunyan "Tripp" Cromer III (born November 21, 1967) is an American former professional baseball player.  He is an alumnus of the University of South Carolina. His younger brother, D. T. was also a Major League Baseball player.

Drafted by the St. Louis Cardinals in the third round of the 1988 MLB amateur draft, Cromer made his Major League Baseball debut with the St. Louis Cardinals on September 7, 1993.

Cromer spent most of his career as a reserve infielder who played for an injured Ozzie Smith after coming up with the St. Louis Cardinals.  Along with the Cardinals, Cromer played for the Los Angeles Dodgers and Houston Astros organizations.

References

External links

1967 births
Living people
People from Lake City, South Carolina
Albuquerque Dukes players
Arkansas Travelers players
Hamilton Redbirds players
Houston Astros players
Los Angeles Dodgers players
Louisville Redbirds players
Baseball players from South Carolina
Major League Baseball second basemen
Major League Baseball shortstops
New Orleans Zephyrs players
San Bernardino Stampede players
South Carolina Gamecocks baseball players
St. Louis Cardinals players
St. Petersburg Cardinals players